Gymnopilus moabus is a species of mushroom in the family Hymenogastraceae.

See also

List of Gymnopilus species

External links
Gymnopilus moabus at Index Fungorum

moabus
Fungi of North America
Taxa named by Cheryl A. Grgurinovic